Saint-Julien (also known as Saint-Julien-le-Montagnier; Provençal: Sant Julian lo Montanhier) is a commune in the Var department in the Provence-Alpes-Côte d'Azur region in southeastern France.

See also
Communes of the Var department

References

Communes of Var (department)